Anne Patrizio  was a British retired teacher and leading campaigner for LGBT rights in Scotland.

As one of the principal organisers of Parents Enquiry Scotland, Patrizio supported parents of lesbian, gay, bisexual and transgender people and gave evidence to the Scottish Parliament in support of gay law reform.

She died in Gorizia, Italy, on 13 April 2019.

References

External links
 Parents Enquiry Scotland website
 BBC Scotland - Section 28 - a parent's view

2019 deaths
Scottish LGBT rights activists
Scottish activists
Members of the Order of the British Empire
Place of birth missing
Scottish schoolteachers
Year of birth missing